Ugly Americans: Apocalypsegeddon is a twin-stick multidirectional shooter based on the Comedy Central television show Ugly Americans. The game was released for PlayStation 3 on August 30, 2011 and for Xbox 360 on August 31, 2011. It was developed by Backbone Entertainment and published by New 38th Floor Productions for the PlayStation 3 and by 345 Games and Comedy Central for the Xbox.

Gameplay

Ugly Americans: Apocalypsegeddon is set in the same world as the television show it is based on, an alternate version of New York City which is inhabited by humans as well as demons, zombies, bird-people and other fictional creatures. Players assume the role of one of four of the main characters from the show, the wizard Leonard, the police officer Grimes, the demon Callie, or Mark, as they fight through the city of New York in side-scrolling combat controlled primarily by the left and right thumb sticks. Ugly Americans: Apocalypsegeddon supports both co-op play and an online multiplayer mode.

Reception

Ugly Americans: Apocalypsegeddon received "generally unfavorable reviews" on both platforms according to the review aggregation website Metacritic. Critics found the game juvenile and repetitive, with characters and enemies repeating the same phrases to the point of annoyance. The game's customization options, which included upgrades to the playable characters and thirty different choices in weapon ammunition, were viewed as shallow.

References

External links
 

2011 video games
Cooperative video games
Multiplayer and single-player video games
PlayStation 3 games
PlayStation Network games
Twin-stick shooters
Side-scrolling video games
Video games about demons
Video games about police officers
Video games about zombies
Video games based on television series
Video games developed in the United States
Video games featuring female protagonists
Video games set in New York City
Xbox 360 Live Arcade games